Shidian County is under the administration of the prefecture-level city of Baoshan, in the west of Yunnan province, China. Its seat is the town of Dianyang.

Administrative divisions
Shidian County has 5 towns, 6 townships and 2 ethnic townships. 
5 towns

6 townships

2 ethnic townships
 Bailang Yi and Bulang
 Mulaoyuan Bulang and Yi

Ethnic groups
According to the Shidian County Gazetteer (1997:544), ethnic Bulang (autonyms Wu , Aiwu , Ben people ) are found in Mulaoyuan Township and Bailang Township; in the villages of Hazhai, Upper Mulaoyuan, Lower Mulaoyuan, Dazhong, and Jianshan; and in Dazhai, Doupo Village, town of Yaoguan.

Climate

References

External links
Shidian County Official Website
Shidian County Tourism Bureau

County-level divisions of Baoshan, Yunnan